Handelia is a genus of flowering plants in the daisy family.

The genus is named for Austrian botanist Heinrich von Handel-Mazzetti (1880-1940).

Species
There is only one known species, Handelia trichophylla, native to Asia (Xinjiang, Afghanistan, Kazakhstan, Pakistan, Uzbekistan).

References

Anthemideae
Flora of Central Asia
Flora of temperate Asia
Monotypic Asteraceae genera